Bobsleigh at the 1998 Winter Olympics consisted of two events at Spiral.  The competition took place between February 16 and February 23, 1998.

Medal summary

Medal table

Germany led the medal table, with two medals, one gold and one bronze. There had never before been a tie for a medal in Olympic bobsleigh history, but the Nagano Games featured two, one in each event, meaning that three gold medals, and seven medals total, were awarded.

France's bronze medal, as a part of the tie in the four-man event, was the country's first in Bobsleigh at the Olympics.

Events

Participating NOCs

Twenty-nine nations participated in Bobsleigh at the 1998 Winter Olympic Games.

References

External links
Wallechinsky, David and Jaime Loucky (2009). "Bobsleigh". In The Complete Book of the Winter Olympics: 2010 Edition. London: Aurum Press Limited.

 
1998
1998 Winter Olympics events
1998 in bobsleigh